Huang Hua (January 25, 1913 – November 24, 2010) was a senior Communist Chinese revolutionary, politician, and diplomat. He served as Foreign Minister of China from 1976 to 1982, and concurrently as Vice Premier from 1980 to 1982. He was instrumental in establishing diplomatic links of the People's Republic of China with the United States and Japan, and was intensely involved in the negotiations with the United Kingdom over the status of Hong Kong.

Biography

Huang Hua was born Wang Rumei in Ci County, Hebei Province in 1913. He was one of the early students at Yenching University in Beijing, where he learned excellent English and developed a close relationship with John Leighton Stuart, the American missionary who founded Yenching.

In 1936, he joined the Communist Party of China at Yenching, and assumed the name Huang Hua. Later that year, he accompanied American journalist Edgar Snow to the Communist base in Yan'an, acting as the interpreter between Snow and the Communist leaders including Mao Zedong. Snow wrote the book Red Star Over China, which introduced the Chinese Communists to the world. Huang Hua remained in Yan'an after Snow left, and worked as an assistant to Marshal Zhu De and later as secretary of Marshal Ye Jianying. He married He Liliang in Yan'an.

After the establishment of the People's Republic of China, Huang's English skills ensured him a position in the newly established Ministry of Foreign Affairs. In the early 1950s, he gained prominence as an effective diplomat. He was involved in the Korean War armistice talks (1953), initial contacts with the United States in Warsaw, Poland (1958), and China's joining of the United Nations (1971).

During the 1960s, Huang spent much of his time abroad serving as ambassador to Ghana and then Egypt. When he returned home during the height of the Cultural Revolution, he was arrested along with his wife and banished to labor reform in the countryside. His exile did not last long however, as he was rehabilitated in 1971 and appointed the PRC's first ambassador to the United Nations.

Beginning in 1971, Huang was the first Permanent Representative to the UN from the People's Republic of China after the UN seat was transferred to the mainland Chinese government. Huang also signed the Sino-Japanese Peace and Friendship Treaty with Japanese Foreign Minister Sonoda on August 12, 1978.

After Mao Zedong's death in 1976, Foreign Minister Qiao Guanhua, an ally of the radical Gang of Four, was dismissed from his post and Huang appointed as his replacement. In this capacity, he served as Foreign Minister for the next six years and presided over the official establishment of diplomatic relations with the US.

When Soviet leader Leonid Brezhnev died in November 1982, a Chinese delegation headed by Huang Hua as  Foreign Minister attended the funeral, where Huang praised the late Soviet leader as "an outstanding champion of world peace," and expressed his hope for normalized relations with Moscow. This was during the Sino-Soviet split, when PRC and the USSR competed for influence in the world. However, Huang's overly hasty actions led to his dismissal from office as soon as he returned home.

Personal life
In 1944, Huang married He Liliang (born July 1926). They had two sons and one daughter. Huang died on 24 November 2010 at the age of 97.

References

External links 
 Huang Hua on Chinese Foreign Ministry

1913 births
2010 deaths
20th-century Chinese politicians
Ambassadors of China to Ghana
Ambassadors of China to Egypt
Foreign Ministers of the People's Republic of China
Permanent Representatives of the People's Republic of China to the United Nations
Politicians from Handan
State councillors of China
Vice Chairpersons of the National People's Congress
Yenching University alumni
Burials at Babaoshan Revolutionary Cemetery